Pedro Marieluz Garcés (or Peter Marielux) (born in 1780 in Tarma/Peru, died on 23 September 1825 in Callao/Peru)  was a Roman Catholic priest who died as a martyr of the Seal of the Confessional.

As a young man, Pedro Marieluz Garcés entered the order of the Camillians and was ordained a priest in 1805.

Later he became a military chaplain with the troops of the Spanish Royal Governor, Ramón Rodil. During the siege of the fortress Real Felipe in the city of Callao after the Battle of Ayacucho, there was a conspiracy made against Rodil by some of the Royal soldiers. The plot was discovered and Rodil sentenced the conspirators to death. They were allowed to confess to Marieluz before being shot. After the execution of the plotters, Rodil is said to have doubted whether he had convicted all members of the plot and, thinking that the executed ones would have revealed everything in confession to Marieluz, he tried to force the confessor to disclose to him what he had heard in the confessions by threatening him to be shot likewise, if he would not obey. But Marieluz remained steadfast and was executed on the evening of 23 September 1825, becoming a martyr in the eyes of the Catholic Church.

Sources
"Father Peter Marielux" in The Holiness of the Church in the nineteenth Century
"A Martyr Priest", Article in the Freeman's Journal, Thursday, 23 May 1912, page 36
"A Martyr Priest", Article in the Klimore Free Press, 11 July 1912
"The Story of Father Marielux. Martyr of Sacramental Seal" in the Freeman's Journal, Thursday, 17 December 1925, page 40

References

1780 births
1825 deaths
19th-century Peruvian Roman Catholic priests
Martyred Roman Catholic priests
Camillians
People from Junín Region
19th-century Roman Catholic martyrs